Evert Fritchof Nelson (February 18, 1907 - December 1, 1992) was an American football offensive tackle who played one season in the National Football League (NFL) for the Chicago Bears. He played seven games in his career, all in 1929.

References

Chicago Bears players
1907 births
1992 deaths
American football tackles
Players of American football from Chicago
Illinois Fighting Illini football players